The 1951 Wightman Cup was the 23rd edition of the annual women's team tennis competition between the United States and Great Britain. It was held at the Longwood Cricket Club, Chestnut Hills, Massachusetts, United States.

References

1951
1951 in tennis
1951 in American tennis
1951 in British sport
1951 in women's tennis
1951 in sports in Massachusetts